A wall plug (UK English), also known as an anchor (US) or "Rawlplug" (UK), is a fibre or plastic (originally wood) insert used to enable the attachment of a screw in material that is porous or brittle or that would otherwise not support the weight of the object attached with the screw. It is a type of anchor that, for example, allows screws to be fitted into masonry walls. In US English, mentions of drywall anchors are sometimes meant (and taken) to refer specifically to the type of plastic wall plugs with expandable wings for hollow walls, in contradistinction with mollies and toggle bolts. 

There are many forms of wall plug, but the most common principle is to use a tapered tube of soft material, such as plastic. This is inserted loosely into a drilled hole, then a screw is tightened into the centre. As the screw enters the plug, the soft material of the plug expands conforming tightly to the wall material. Such anchors can attach one object to another in situations where screws, nails, adhesives, or other simple fasteners are either impractical or ineffective. Different types have different levels of strength and can be used on different types of surfaces.

History 

Before commercial wall plugs, fixings were made to brick or masonry walls by chiselling a groove into a soft mortar joint, hammering in a crude wooden plug and then attaching to the wooden plug. This was time consuming and required a large hole, thus more patching of the wall afterwards. It also limited the holes' location to the mortar joints.

The original wall plug was invented by John Joseph Rawlings in 1911, and marketed under the name Rawlplug. These plugs became popular after the First World War, when a demand for retro-fitting existing buildings with new electric lighting coincided with a shortage of labour, encouraging many new labour-saving innovations in the building trade. Rawlplug gained their prominence from their adoption in the British Museum.

Early wall plugs were thick-walled fibre tubes, made of parallel strings bonded with glue. The Rawlings brothers conducted thousand of trials using many diverse materials in their search for the perfect plug. Among the many solutions tested were plugs made of lead, zinc, natural and synthetic rubber, hemp fibres, glass, wood, and paper. They imported Indian jute as it possessed natural resistance to the effects of humidity and for particularly damp conditions they developed a range of white bronze plugs. Most current brands are plastic, first designed in 1958 by German inventor Artur Fischer, known as the Fischer Wall Plug.

Other varieties of wall plug are mechanical anchors for heavy duty loads and hollow wall fixings for fixing to plasterboard. The first mechanical anchor, the Rawlbolt, was designed in the 1930s by the Rawlplug company and the first fixing for hollow walls was the Toggle Bolt, which was also designed by Rawlplug in 1941.

Split-ribbed anchor 

Nowadays, one of the most common designs for light loads is the split-ribbed plastic anchor. It consist of two halves that increase their separation (split) as the screw penetrates between them. As its name suggests, this type of anchor also has ribs on the outside to prevent the anchor from slipping out of the hole as the screw is driven in. This type of anchor is also known as a conical screw anchor.

Fibre and resin mixes 

On crumbling walls it may be difficult to drill a clean hole, or the force of the expanding plug may be enough to cause cracking. In these cases, a hardening liquid or putty mixture may be used instead.

One of the first of these mixtures was produced by Rawlplug and was composed of dry white asbestos fibres, sold loose in a tin. The user wetted some into a ball (usually by spitting on them) and pushed this plug of putty into the hole. A small tamper and spike was supplied with the kit. This putty worked very well, but the hazard of the asbestos fibres means that the product is no longer available. 
However, another way to fix wall plugs is accomplished by the application of a cotton woven pad which has been impregnated with a special formulated gypsum to bond into the wall. The pad is wetted and wrapped around the wall plug, and the two are inserted into the hole; after a short time it hardens and a strong bond is achieved and the wall fitting can be applied. It is used in combination with wall plugs in masonry, ceramic, wood and plasterboard walls.

Modern resin mixtures are based on polyester resins. Apart from their use in construction, they're also used in climbing.

Hollow walls
There are special fasteners for hollow walls such as plasterboard partitions, which are not thick enough to take wall plugs. The fasteners have toggle arms, which either drop into place or expand within the cavity, and a fixing screw which is threaded through them.

Expansion anchors

These are often called "lead anchors" or "plastic anchors", and are used as follows:

Drill a hole the same size as the anchor body.
Push the anchor to its full depth in the hole.
Insert the screw through the item being fastened and screw it into the anchor tightly.

Other types
Anchors designed especially for fastening to hollow walls, include toggle bolts and molly bolts.
These wall anchors are also known by other names, such as, "tacos", drywall hangers, expansion nuts, etc.

See also 
 Well nut

Notes

References 

Fasteners
English inventions
1911 introductions
Articles containing video clips
Wall anchors